Seuserenre Khyan (also Khayan or Khian was a Hyksos king of the Fifteenth Dynasty of Egypt, ruling over Lower Egypt in the second half of the 17th century BCE. His royal name Seuserenre translates as "The one whom Re has caused to be strong." Khyan bears the titles of an Egyptian king, but also the title ruler of the foreign land (heqa-khaset). The later title is the typical designation of the Hyksos rulers.

Khyan is one of the better attested kings from the Hyksos period, known from many seals and seal impressions. Remarkable are objects with his name found at Knossos and Hattusha indicating diplomatic contacts with Crete and the Hittites. A sphinx with his name was bought on the art market at Baghdad and might demonstrate diplomatic contacts to Babylon, in an example of Egypt-Mesopotamia relations.

Hyksos Kingdom
Khyan's seat of power was located in Avaris, which hosted a strongly fortified palace. Seal impressions of Khyan and a stela of his eldest son, prince Yanassi, were found in two areas of the city during excavations, confirming his presence onsite. The palace, possibly destroyed during the later conquest of the Hyksos' kingdom by the Thebans under Ahmose I, comprised a high platform built on massive brick casemates surrounded by columned halls and monumental staircases leading to a still higher platform, on which the royal apartments probably stood. Some of these fragments came from an array of vessels produced by the Kerma culture, a Nubian kingdom and Hyksos' ally during the Second Intermediate Period.
The Egyptologist Manfred Bietak proposes that the ritual feast and abandonment of the palace were triggered by the death of its owner, most probably Khyan. 
On the western edge of Avaris, another fortress was subsequently erected in the later Hyksos period c. 1560-1530 BC, likely under Khyan's successor Apepi.

East of Avaris, the Hyksos controlled the massive  fortress of Tjaru on the road to Sinai and Canaan, where stelae of the Hyksos king Apepi were uncovered.

According to Manfred Bietak, Khyan's rule marks the peak of the Hyksos kingdom power. In this view, Khyan directly ruled over Lower and Middle Egypt up to Cusae and indirectly dominated the Nile Valley as far south as Thebes, forcing native Egyptian kingdoms including those of the 16th and Abydos Dynasty into vassal states. At the time of Khyan, relations between the Hyksos and their Egyptian vassals were likely peaceful, centered on exchange and trade and possibly even including donations to Upper Egyptian sanctuaries, such as one in Gebelein, were blocks inscribed with Khyan's name were uncovered. All of this is contested however. For Alexander Ilin-Tomich, the territory directly ruled by the Hyksos kings of Avaris was likely confined to the eastern Delta and the nature and extent of their control over Middle Egypt remains unclear.

Khyan's position in the Hyksos dynasty

Khyan is identified with king Iannas in the works of Josephus whose knowledge of the Hyksos Pharaohs was derived from a history of Egypt written by Manetho. Josephus mentions him after Apophis when discussing the reign lengths of kings who ruled after Salitis. This led 18th century scholars such as Arthur Bedford to place Khyan after Apophis, towards the end of the Hyksos dynasty. However, in Sextus Julius Africanus' version of Manetho's Epitome, Khyan (whose name is transcribed there as Staan) is listed after a king Pachnan, perhaps Yaqub-Har. Nonetheless, the hypothesis of a temporal proximity between kings Khyan and Apepi is now commonly accepted though questionable and contested.
Stylistically Khyan's scarabs resemble closely those of Yaqub-Har, who might date rather to the beginning and not to the end of the Hyksos-period. This indicates that Khyan was one of the earlier rulers of the 15th dynasty.

The early position of Khyan within the 15th dynasty may be confirmed by new archaeological finds at Edfu. On this site were found seal impressions of Khyan in close connection with seal impressions of the 13th Dynasty king Sobekhotep IV, indicating that both kings could have reigned at about the same time. The scholars Moeller and Marouard discuss the discovery of an important early 12th dynasty Middle Kingdom administrative building in the eastern Tell Edfu area which was continuously employed into the early Second Intermediate Period before it fell out of use during the 17th dynasty when its remains were sealed by a large silo court. Fieldwork by Egyptologists in 2010 and 2011 into the remains of the former 12th dynasty building which was also used in the 13th dynasty led to the discovery of a large adjoining hall which proved to contain 41 sealings showing the cartouche of the Hyksos ruler Khyan together with 9 sealings naming the 13th dynasty king Sobekhotep IV. As Moeller and Marouard write: "These finds come from a secure and sealed archaeological context and open up new questions about the cultural and chronological evolution of the late Middle Kingdom and early Second Intermediate Period." These conclusions are rejected by Robert Porter who argues that Khyan ruled much later than Sobekhotep IV and that the seals of a pharaoh were used even long after his death. Another option he proposed is that Sobekhotep IV reigned much later than previously thought.

Nearly all carbon-14 analyses of materials related to the Second Intermediate Period yield dates on average 120 years earlier than was expected from the prevailing chronological reconstruction of the 15th Dynasty. While the debate is ongoing, Egyptologists have acknowledged the validity of these observations and that they indicate some major issue with the consensus reached hitherto. Khyan's rule is no longer dated with any accuracy. The Egyptologist David Aston has showed available evidence is compatible with Khyan ruling anywhere between 1700 BC and 1580 BC, with the former his preferred scenario. The possibility that one or more kings reigned between him and Apophis is now the dominant hypothesis.

A stela of Khyan mentioning a king's son was also discovered at Avaris. Manfred Bietak observed that: 
"a stela set up in Avaris contains the nomen and prenomen of Khyan and a now lost dedication (presumably to Seth, Lord of Avaris) below which are inscribed the title and name of the Eldest King's Son Yanassi."

The Danish Egyptologist Kim Ryholt, who published an extensive catalogue of the monuments of all the numerous pharaohs of the Second Intermediate Period, notes an important personal detail regarding this king's family; Ryholt writes that the association of Khyan with those of his eldest son upon this stela suggests that Yanassi in fact was his designated successor, as also implied by his title." Ryholt speculates that Manetho might have mentioned Yanassi in a now lost passage and that one possible explanation of the name Iannas used by Josephus for Khyan is a misquotation of such a passage in which the son's name was extracted instead of the father's.

Origin of Khyan's name
Ryholt notes that the name, Khyan, generally has been "interpreted as Amorite Hayanu (reading h-ya-a-n) which the Egyptian form represents perfectly, and this is in all likelihood the correct interpretation."  It should be stressed that Khyan's name was not original and had been in use for centuries before the fifteenth (Hyksos) Dynasty. The name Hayanu is recorded in the Assyrian king lists—see "Khorsabad List I, 17 and the SDAS List, I, 16"--"for a remote ancestor of Shamshi-Adad I (c.1800 BC)."

Notes

References

Bibliography

Further reading
Irene Forster-Müller, Nadine Moeller (eds.), The Hyksos Ruler Khyan and the Early Second Intermediate Period in Egypt: Problems and Priorities of Current Research. Proceedings of the Workshop of the Austrian Archaeological Institute and the Oriental Institute of the University of Chicago, Vienna, July 4–5, 2014.(online)

17th-century BC Pharaohs
16th-century BC Pharaohs
Pharaohs of the Fifteenth Dynasty of Egypt
Amorite kings
Year of birth unknown
Year of death unknown